During the 2007–08 Scottish football season, Falkirk competed in the Scottish Premier League.

Season summary
Falkirk repeated last season's 7th placed finish.

Kit
Falkirk's kit was manufactured by Lotto, following the end of Falkirk's deal with TFG. The kit was sponsored by Central Demolition.

The home kit was designed to resemble Falkirk's kit from their 1957 Scottish Cup triumph, to commemorate the 50th anniversary of the victory.

First-team squad
Squad at end of season

Left club during season

League table

References

Falkirk F.C.
Falkirk F.C. seasons
2007–08 in Scottish football